The Men's 1500 metres competition at the 2023 World Single Distances Speed Skating Championships was held on 5 March 2023.

Results
The race was started at 12:45.

References

Men's 1500 metres